The Chemical Workers' Industrial Union (CWIU) was a trade union representing workers in chemical and related industries in South Africa.

History
The union was founded on 24 November 1974, on the initiative of the General Factory Workers' Benefit Fund.  By the end of the year, it had about 1,000 members and had affiliated to the Trade Union Advisory and Co-ordinating Council.  It developed a strategy of focusing on mass organisation in a small number of factories, mostly Revertex and Henkel.  It declined to only 500 members in 1979, but that year became a founding affiliate of the Federation of South African Trade Unions.  It expanded into the Transvaal in 1980, and by 1981 had grown to 4,200 members.

The union absorbed the Glass and Allied Workers' Union in December 1982.  It was a founding affiliate of the Congress of South African Trade Unions in 1985, and by 1986 had grown further, to 29,859 members.  In 1999, it merged with the Paper, Printing and Allied Workers' Union, to form the Chemical, Energy, Paper, Printing, Wood and Allied Workers' Union.

General Secretaries
1970s: Nombuso Dlamini
1980s: Rod Crompton
1991: Muzi Buthelezi

References

Chemical industry
Trade unions established in 1974
Trade unions disestablished in 1999
Trade unions in South Africa